Henri Godfriaux (c. 1888 – March 5, 1954) was an American football and basketball coach. He served as the head football coach at Missouri Valley College in Marshall, Missouri from 1925 to 1936, and William Jewell College in Liberty, Missouri from 1937 to 1946, compiling a career college football coaching record of 87–62–12. Godfriaux was also the head basketball coach at William Jewell from 1941 to 1946, tallying a mark of 18–57.

Godfriaux died at the age of 65, on March 5, 1954, at his home in Liberty, after suffering a self-inflicted gunshot wound. He had been stricken with cancer.

Head coaching record

College football

References

1880s births
1954 deaths
Missouri Valley Vikings football coaches
William Jewell Cardinals football coaches
William Jewell Cardinals men's basketball coaches
High school football coaches in Missouri